Firestone Diversified Products, LLC is an American umbrella company that houses Firestone Building Products, Firestone Specialty Products, Firestone Industrial Products Company, and Firestone Natural Rubber Company. The non-tire arm of Firestone Tire and Rubber Company, a subsidiary of Bridgestone, Firestone Diversified Products is headquartered in Indianapolis, Indiana and operates in 23 U.S. states as well as 10 countries worldwide.  The company reports annual sales of $2.5 billion.

References

External links
Firestone Building Products Company
Firestone Specialty Products Company

Bridgestone